Klaus Salmutter (born January 3, 1984) is a former Austrian football player who played as a midfielder.

Club career
Born in Graz, Salmutter played 5 years for hometown club Sturm Graz before joining LASK Linz on free transfer in summer 2008.

International career
He made his debut for Austria in November 2006 against Trinidad & Tobago and has earned 4 caps (no goals) until August 2008.

External links

1984 births
Living people
Footballers from Graz
Austrian footballers
Austria international footballers
SK Sturm Graz players
LASK players
FC Schalke 04 players
Austrian Football Bundesliga players
Association football midfielders